Berry Hill may refer to:

In England:
Berry Hill, Gloucestershire
Berry Hill High School and Sports College, a secondary school in Staffordshire

In Scotland:
Berry Hill, Aberdeenshire, site of a chalybeate spring well

In the United States:

Berry Hill (Glenview, Kentucky), a National Register of Historic Places listing in Jefferson County, Kentucky 
Berry Hill (Taconic Mountains), a peak in western Massachusetts
Berry Hill (New York), a peak in central New York
Berry Hill, Tennessee
Berry Hill, Virginia
Berry Hill (Berry Hill, Virginia), NRHP-listed
Berry Hill (Orange, Virginia), NRHP-listed
Berry Hill Plantation in South Boston, Virginia
Berry Hill Elementary School, as part of the Syosset Central School District

See also
Berryhill (disambiguation)